District 7 of the Oregon State Senate comprises parts of northern Lane County in the Eugene metropolitan area. It is currently represented by Democrat James Manning Jr. of Eugene.

Election results
District boundaries have changed over time, therefore, senators before 2013 may not represent the same constituency as today. From 1993 until 2003, the district covered parts of southeast Portland, and from 2003 until 2013 it covered a slightly different area in Lane County.

References

07
Lane County, Oregon
Linn County, Oregon